Kataklik Kangri (or Kataklik Kangri I & II) are two of the highest mountains in the mountain group which are located in the east of the Shyok River's upper reaches, which lies in the far west of the Transhimalaya.

Locations 

Kataklik Kangri massif has two prominent peaks.

 Kataklik Kangri I is at 6,897 m /22,628 ft above sea level. It is located on the Line of Actual Control (armistice line) between Aksai Chin (China) and the Indian Union territory of Ladakh. The prominence is 1,548m/5,079 ft. The glaciers on its flanks are drained via Shyok River. (Coordinates: 34°56'29.4"N, 78°10'57.1"E)

 Kataklik Kangri II is at 6,820 m /22,375 ft above sea level. It is located 4.9 km south-southeast of Kataklik Kangri I. The prominence is 564m/1,850 ft. (Coordinates: 34°54'09.7"N, 78°12'25.3"E)

There are no records of ascents (for either peak) in the Himalayan Index. And till 2005, some explorers' travelogues claimed that  the peaks were "completely unknown, never been attempted or explored".

The above heights and coordinates are supported by many sources, but disputed by German Wikipedia, which has the higher peak at the south location. This claim is supported by American military survey mapping, Digital Elevation Model data published by the Polar Geospatial Center and a list of summits at 8000ers.

References 

Mountains of the Transhimalayas
Six-thousanders of the Transhimalayas
Mountains of Ladakh